Lebanon is a sovereign state in Western Asia. It is bordered by Syria to the north and east and Israel to the south, while Cyprus is west across the Mediterranean Sea. Lebanon’s economy follows a laissez-faire model. Most of the economy is dollarized, and the country has no restrictions on the movement of capital across its borders. The Lebanese government’s intervention in foreign trade is minimal.

Notable firms 
This list includes notable companies with primary headquarters located in the country. The industry and sector follow the Industry Classification Benchmark taxonomy. Organizations which have ceased operations are included and noted as defunct.

See also 
 List of companies listed on the Beirut Stock Exchange

References 

 
Lebanon